Bhagat Ram is an Indian politician. He was elected to the Lok Sabha, the lower house of the Parliament of India from the Phillaur constituency of Punjab as a member of the Communist Party of India (Marxist).

References

1942 births
Communist Party of India (Marxist) politicians from Punjab, India
Lok Sabha members from Punjab, India
India MPs 1977–1979
Living people
People from Jalandhar district